In mathematics, the Bachmann–Howard ordinal (also known as the Howard ordinal, or Howard-Bachmann ordinal) is a large countable ordinal.
It is the proof-theoretic ordinal of several mathematical theories, such as  Kripke–Platek set theory (with the axiom of infinity) and the system CZF of constructive set theory.

Definition
The Bachmann–Howard ordinal is defined using an ordinal collapsing function:
εα enumerates the epsilon numbers, the ordinals ε such that ωε = ε.
Ω = ω1 is the first uncountable ordinal.
εΩ+1 is the first epsilon number after Ω = εΩ.
ψ(α) is defined to be the smallest ordinal that cannot be constructed by starting with 0, 1, ω and Ω, and repeatedly applying ordinal addition, multiplication and exponentiation, and ψ to previously constructed ordinals (except that ψ can only be applied to arguments  less than α, to ensure that it is well defined).
The Bachmann–Howard ordinal is ψ(εΩ+1).

References

  (Slides of a talk given at Fischbachau.)

Citations

Proof theory
Ordinal numbers